The Scheidemann cabinet (German: Kabinett Scheidemann) was the first democratically elected Reichsregierung of the German Reich. It took office on 13 February 1919. Although the Weimar Constitution was not in force yet, it is generally counted as the first government of the Weimar Republic. It was based on the Weimar Coalition of centre-left parties. Ministerpräsident Philipp Scheidemann resigned in protest against the Treaty of Versailles on 20 June 1919. His cabinet was followed by the government of Gustav Bauer.

Election and establishment

Following the collapse of the German Empire and the German Revolution of 1918-19, on 19 January 1919 the Germans had voted in elections for the Nationalversammlung. At the time, the country was governed by the Council of the People's Deputies (Rat der Volksbeauftragten), a revolutionary government made up of members of the Social Democratic Party of Germany (SPD), which had also been the largest party in the Reichstag since the last elections in 1912. The January elections returned a smaller than expected share of the vote for the socialists (SPD: 38%, USPD: 7%, the communists of the KPD had boycotted the elections).

The National Assembly, meeting in Weimar because conditions in the capital Berlin were deemed too chaotic for the deliberations and Weimar was associated with Weimar Classicism, acted as unicameral legislature and constituent assembly for the new republic. After its inaugural session on 6 February it passed a provisional constitution known as Gesetz über die vorläufige Reichsgewalt. Friedrich Ebert (SPD), chairman of the Council of the People's Deputies, was elected on 11 February as temporary Reichspräsident, or head of state. That same day, Ebert asked his fellow Volksbeauftragter Philipp Scheidemann (SPD) to form the new government, referred to in the law as Reichsministerium.

In fact, at that point, coalition negotiations had been going on for a while. The SPD was talking to the DDP and the Zentrum. However, the SPD was making this cooperation conditional on the acceptance by the "bourgeois" parties of a) a republican form of state, b) a fiscal policy that would "severely" target wealth and c) a socialisation of "suitable" industries. Although the SPD did approach the USPD, Ebert reportedly said that he had only conducted talks with the extreme left so that they would bear the responsibility for the talks' failure. For their part, the DDP would not have accepted a coalition with the USPD.

The negotiations were difficult and dragged on. In particular, the presidency of the National Assembly was hotly contested and almost caused the talks to fail. Finally, it was agreed that Eduard David (SPD) who had been the initial president would resign (and join the cabinet in compensation), making way for the former president of the Reichstag, Constantin Fehrenbach (Zentrum).

Apart from Ebert himself–who had said that he preferred the more representative office of head of state–Scheidemann had been the clear favourite to become head of government. With the exception of Ebert all the other Volksbeauftragen joined the new cabinet. Gustav Noske had previously been in charge of Army and Navy affairs, and he became Defence Minister. Otto Landsberg, the leading thinker on law on the Council became Minister of Justice. Rudolf Wissell had been in charge of economic affairs and kept that portfolio. Gustav Bauer had been a member of the Cabinet Baden in charge of the newly formed Labour Ministry (Reichsarbeitsamt), a position he had continued to hold through the revolution. Robert Schmidt (Minister for Food) and Eduard David, with no portfolio but charged with looking at the question of what responsibility Germany had in bringing about the Great War, completed the SPD members of cabinet.

Against seven members from the SPD there were three from the DDP (Hugo Preuß, Georg Gothein and Eugen Schiffer) and three from the Zentrum (Johannes Giesberts, Johannes Bell and Matthias Erzberger). Schiffer had been a member of the National Liberal Party and served as Secretary of State for the Treasury in the Empire but had joined the DDP after the November revolution. Erzberger had been a member of the Cabinet Baden, had negotiated the Armistice in November 1918 and remained in charge of negotiations with the Allies.

In the coalition talks, Ulrich Graf von Brockdorff-Rantzau had been treated as a member of the DDP although he did not belong to the party. He was a career diplomat and in January 1919 Ebert and Scheidemann had asked him to take over the office of Secretary of State of the Foreign Office. This was also the portfolio he held in the Cabinet Scheidemann.

Finally, in addition to these fourteen politicians there were three members of the military who had an ex officio seat at the cabinet table but no right to vote in decisions of the cabinet. They were the Prussian Minister of War, since early January 1919 Oberst Walther Reinhardt, Oberstleutnant Joseph Koeth who headed the former Reichsamt now Reichsministerium für die wirtschaftliche Demobilmachung (i.e. was in charge of the transition from a war economy to a peace time economy) and the head of the Navy. Initially, the latter position was held by the acting Secretary of State for the Navy who had no official standing in the cabinet at all. This changed after the Reichsmarineamt was dissolved and replaced with the Admiralty in March 1919. Chef der Admiralität Adolf von Trotha then became a non-voting member of the cabinet.

Two features of the cabinet are conspicuous: Firstly, the balance of power between seven SPD members and seven representatives (if Brockdorff-Rantzau is counted as DDP) from the "bourgeois" parties. Secondly, there was a strong continuity in the personnel of government, especially considering the fact that the country had just gone through a revolution. Seven members of the Cabinet Scheidemann had been Secretary of State or Undersecretary under the final Imperial government of Max von Baden (Scheidemann, Schiffer, Bauer, Schmidt, Giesberts, David and Erzberger). Another six had held offices under the Council of the People's Deputies (Brockdorff-Rantzau, Preuß, Wissell, Noske, Landsberg and Koeth). Among the Social Democrats, the moderates or conservative "reformists" predominated. This constellation enabled the government to draw on considerable experience in government and administration, but it underscored the distance between the government and some of the driving forces behind the revolution, notably the unions, the far-left and many common workers. Nevertheless, the Cabinet Scheidemann was based on parties representing more than 75% of all voters. No other government of the Weimar Republic would ever have a larger majority in parliament (Nationalversammlung or Reichstag).

Overview of the members
The members of the cabinet (known collectively as Reichsministerium) were as follows:

Notes

Legal position and differences with other cabinets of the German Reich
The legal position of the Cabinet Scheidemann was different from both its predecessors under the Empire and those that followed it. Since it was set up to operate only as a transitory government until the new constitution came into force, it was very provisional and improvised in nature. The law that established it was quite vague in many respects. The cabinet's role was mentioned in the law only as follows:
 §2: For bringing government proposals to the National Assembly the assent of the Staatenausschuss (the chamber in which the individual states were represented) was needed. If no consensus could be found between cabinet and Staatenausschuss both versions would be submitted.
 §3: Members of the government had the right to attend sessions of the National Assembly and to speak there at any time.
 §8: For the purpose of governance the Reichspräsident was to appoint a Reichsministerium which would be in charge of all Reichsbehörden (Reich agencies) including the Oberste Heeresleitung (OHL). The Reichsminister were required to possess the confidence of the National Assembly.
§9: All decrees and executive orders of the Reichspräsident required the counter-signature of a Reichsminister. The Reichsminister were accountable to the National Assembly for the conduct of their affairs.  
It remained unclear what consequences it would have if a Reichsminister lost the confidence of the National Assembly. The most obvious difference with the system under the old Empire and with future cabinets under the Weimar Constitution was that this government was based on the principle of equality between all its members (Kollegialkabinett). The Ministerpräsident was not even mentioned in the law, he thus lacked any special powers and real standing. In fact, he was not much more than a moderator. By contrast, under the old system all the Staatssekretäre had reported directly to the Chancellor, he had been the only "minister" (accountable to the Emperor and, after the change in the constitution in October 1918, to the Reichstag).

The Übergangsgesetz of 4 March clarified the legal position of the existing body of law and its relation to those laws passed by the National Assembly. It also stipulated that the old Imperial constitution was still valid, unless it was in contradiction to a newer law. The constitutional position of the Reichstag was taken over by the National Assembly, that of the Bundesrat by the Staatenausschuss, the Emperor was replaced by the Reichspräsident and the Reichsministerium replaced the Chancellor. The powers previously vested within the centralised position of the Chancellor were thus distributed to all members of the cabinet who were independently responsible for their portfolios. This played a crucial role in accommodating the quarrels and the lack of cooperation that were to become a defining feature of the Cabinet Scheidemann.

Finally, the Erlaß des Reichspräsidenten betreffend die Errichtung und Bezeichnung der obersten Reichsbehörden (presidential decree on setting up the highest national authorities) of 21 March 1919 established the various portfolios within the Reichsministerium. However, it also added a confusing new contradiction by allocating the responsibility for "conducting the affairs of the Reich" to the Reichsministerium whilst the original Gesetz had allocated that very task to the Reichspräsident himself. This decree also mentioned the Präsident des Reichsministeriums (i.e. the Ministerpräsident) for the first time.

Internal and external security
As the January Uprising in Berlin had amply demonstrated, the domestic security situation in the Reich remained highly volatile in early 1919. Shortly after the Cabinet took office, what became known as the Märzkämpfe erupted in Berlin. In addition to these civil-war-like challenges to the parliamentary government by the workers' councils from the left, who wanted to establish a dictatorship of the councils (Räterepublik), there were separatist movements at work in several parts of the country. One of the government's primary tasks thus was to restore law and order and to ensure that the population throughout the Reich accepted it as the legitimate authority.

Left-wing uprisings
The elections of 19 January were another disappointment for the radical left after the KPD as well as the USPD had been further incensed against the government by the bloody suppression of the Januaraufstand (January Uprising). Between February and May 1919 numerous "wild" (i.e. without union authorization) strikes, armed uprisings and occupation of plants (especially in the mining industry around Halle and in the Ruhr) took place. The workers and their leaders demanded preservation and expansion of the council system, the socialisation of key industries, democratisation of the military via soldiers' councils, higher wages and better working conditions. The government used paramilitary Freikorps and regular troops to crush left-wing uprisings and Räterepubliken. In February, government forces occupied the North Sea ports. Also in February, Freikorps and regular units moved into Mitteldeutschland and subsequently occupied Gotha and Halle. In April, Magdeburg, Helmstadt and Braunschweig were taken, followed by Leipzig and Eisenach in May and Erfurt in June.

In Berlin, the radical left parties organised a general strike to achieve the democratisation of the armed forces. The KPD tried to turn the strike into an insurrection. This resulted in a state of emergency being declared. On 9 March, Gustav Noske, endowed with executive power, authorised the military and police to shoot instantly "anyone encountered who is fighting government troops with arms". Around 1,000 people died in the Märzkämpfe.

Similarly, in Bavaria a second Räterepublik had been declared and the government saw a serious risk of the state seceding from the Reich. In mid-April, the government intervened militarily, Munich was taken on 1 May. Once again, hundreds of people including many civilians were killed in the fighting. The left-wing uprisings had been accompanied by widespread strikes that had escalated to a form of civil war in some parts of the country, notably in the Ruhr area. These strikes and resulting economic disruptions were a serious threat to the stability of the Reich, as the supply of food to the population was already tenuous. Since the Allies had threatened to cut off food shipments to a striking Germany and any losses in tax income would make it harder yet to comply with their demands, the strikes were directly endangering negotiations about extensions of the Armistice.

Separatist movements
In the West, the occupied Rhineland had been transformed by the Armistice into an area in which the Reich government was virtually without any effective power. Anti-Prussian and pro-French sentiment ran high among some members of the middle-class in the Rhineland and this was used by the French and Belgian occupation forces to foster separatistic tendencies. The cabinet could react to requests for aid or action from that part of the country mainly by issuing declarations and protest notes to the Allies or by public agitation. However, the scope even for these responses was limited as the Allies might have treated them as violations of the Armistice. The government's appointment of a Reichs- and Staatskommissar for the occupied territory was just a political gesture. The government thus had to work through other channels, like the National Assembly delegates from the area, local dignitaries or the local organisations of the Weimar Coalition parties.

The situation was even more complicated in the Ostprovinzen of Prussia. There were obvious separatist groups at work, although paradoxically they arose from patriotic sentiments. German bureaucrats, officers, Volksräte (set up in response to a similar institution of the Poles) and refugees from Posen were developing various ideas for a German or German-Polish  should the Treaty of Versailles be signed. Although the various plans were inconsistent and contradictory, the general idea was that by temporarily exiting the Reich, these parts (East Prussia, West Prussia, the Netzedistrikt, Silesia and Posen) should deal with the political and military challenges offered by Poland without being bound by the diplomatic shackles imposed on the Reich itself. A new state incorporating East and West Prussia as well as Livland, Kurland and Lithuania was also mooted, drawing on earlier ideas of a United Baltic Duchy.

At the time, the Province of Posen was almost completely occupied by Polish forces. Despite a German-Polish armistice there were constant skirmishes along the line of control. Troop concentrations on both sides threatened an escalation of the situation and, due to the relative strength of the forces involved, a reconquest of Posen and possibly even further advances by German troops seemed likely. Although this was primarily a problem for the government of Prussia, the Cabinet had to deal with the issue due to the danger of unauthorised action by the German army or by Posen refugees. Initially trying to appease the separatists with political gestures, the cabinet soon had to re-evaluate the situation as more serious. It considered channeling the political forces in the Ostprovinzen towards a plebiscite about remaining in the Reich. However, the Prussian Government opposed this plan, fearing that a majority might actually decide against continued membership of the Reich. The idea of a plebiscite was dropped. Opposition from the cabinet (especially Gustav Noske), president Friedrich Ebert and Wilhelm Groener of the OHL at Kolberg, helped prevent a secession or a unilateral military move against Poland in the summer of 1919. Walther Reinhardt, however, had been a firm supporter of the Oststaat plan.

Economic policies

General issues
A major matter of dispute in the cabinet was the field of economic policy, notably the basic choice of an economic system that was to prevail in the new republic. The SPD was still a socialist party at the time, based on Marxist ideas as laid down in the Erfurter Programm of 1891: once the proletariat had won control over the government, major industrial enterprises were to be socialised (nationalised) in order to achieve the "socialization of the means of production". The radicalism of this approach was softened somewhat by the theory of "revisionism", by that time dominant in the SPD, i.e. a tendency to focus on short-term reformist progress rather than on the achievement of long-term goals through revolutionary action.

By contrast, the DDP ministers and some from the Zentrum (especially Erzberger) subscribed to a liberal, market-oriented view of the economy. According to this approach, the main goal of economic policy was to maximise productivity. This implied a rapid dismantling of the command economy that had been created during the war years, as well as an end to capital- and currency-controls and to trade barriers.

Things were complicated further by a third school of thought that dominated thinking by many in the Reichswirtschaftsamt at the time, notably that of Walther Rathenau and Wichard von Moellendorff. This concept of Gemeinwirtschaftspolitik combined private property rights with a strong element of central planning and a forced syndication (i.e. association) of industries organised by the state. All those involved in the production processes, including the workers, were supposed to play a role in the administration of these industries. Government control of foreign trade also was a key aspect of this policy.

These three approaches to economic policy were almost mutually exclusive. Bauer (Labour) and Schmidt (Food) subscribed to views based on the Erfurter Programm. Gothein, Schiffer and Dernburg (Finance) were free-market liberals. Wissell (Economic Affairs) advocated the Gemeinwirtschaftspolitik. To avoid a serious confrontation, the coalition partners kept the economic policies of the cabinet intentionally vague. This became evident in Scheidemann's Regierungserklärung of 13 February which steered clear of topics like foreign trade or the currency altogether. Although this prevented a clash over the cabinet's internal differences, it meant that important decisions on economic policies were not taken by the cabinet but left to individual ministers who would then often come into conflict with each other. This tendency was reinforced by the constitutional equality of the ministers. A direct result were bitter disputes over who was in charge of specific policy issues, made worse by personal animosities between some of the ministers.

Scheidemann's Regierungserklärung (government programme) included policies such as improvements in educational standards, the establishment of a people's army, adequate provision for war widows and war-wounded servicemen, establishing the universal right of association in the constitution, acquiring new land for settlement, heavy taxation of wartime profits, and making a start to the planned improvement "of public health, protection of mothers, and care of children and young people."

In March 1919, strikes in the Ruhr, Mitteldeutschland and Berlin caused the government to announce placating measures that were more in line with Wissell's views than with the liberal or socialist approaches. Wissell used the opportunity to push forward a socialisation program as well as rules for the coal and potash industries. That would be the first and only victory for the advocates of Gemeinwirtschaft, however. In April, a law that was to set up the regulation of the paper industry was first changed substantially by the cabinet and then rejected by the National Assembly.

In May, the DDP members of the cabinet attempted to rein in the Reichswirtschaftsministerium by making use of a conflict between Wissell and Schmidt concerning international trade policy. The Brüsseler Abkommen (March 1919) with the Allies governed imports of food on which Germany depended. To ensure funds for these food imports would be available, the cabinet now created a committee called diktatorischer Wirtschaftsausschuß (dictatorial economic committee) consisting of Wissell, Gothein and Schmidt. A simple majority of 2:1 was required for a decision. The committee's decisions on trade and currencies would have the same binding power as cabinet decrees. Wissell was regularly outvoted by the other two. On 6 May, Dernburg announced publicly that the committee would eliminate the wartime coercive industry structures, an important foundation of Wissell's policies. The next day, Wissell wrote a protest note to Scheidemann, demanded an SPD-only cabinet and threatened to resign. He also presented a memorandum and program of action that summarised the Gemeinwirtschaftspolitik approach. Schmidt and Gothein responded by presenting opposing memoranda. Before the row could escalate, the Allies informed the Germans about the content of the Treaty of Versailles and the cabinet focussed on this issue. However, Wissell was on the defensive against those favouring a liberalisation of foreign trade and was unable to push through his views. He did succeed in winning a sort of ceasefire on the issue of abolishing currency controls on 7 June—at that point the cabinet would be in office for only another two weeks.

The differences on economic policy within the cabinet were large enough to have brought about a break-up of the coalition sooner or later if the issue of the Treaty had not caused its resignation. Nevertheless, economics was the only field of policy in which the cabinet engaged in medium- to long-term thinking. Otherwise, the cabinet was mostly concerned with dealing with urgent short-term issues (e.g. assistance for the unemployed, for veterans and the wounded or a severe lack of agricultural workers) and taking ad-hoc decisions.

Fiscal policy
This applied in particular to fiscal policy. Moving the Reich's finances from a war footing to a peacetime setting, dealing with the huge rise in public debt caused by the war and closing the large budget deficit were daunting challenges. Yet any systematic approach was impossible given the degree of uncertainty about the contents of the peace treaty. Neither the coming burden from reparations nor—given the prospect of territorial losses—the future productive capacity of the German Reich were known to the government. A significant fiscal reform would have required the transfer of taxation powers (like income, corporate and inheritance) from the individual States (Länder) to the Reich, since under the Empire the central government had been quite dependent on fiscal contributions from the States. Since opposition from the Länder in this respect was to be expected, any progress in that direction was unlikely until the fundamental changes of the new constitution came into force. Fiscal reform thus took place only after the Weimar Constitution had come into force (Erzbergersche Finanzreformen), but Schiffer and Dernburg did some important preparatory work and the Cabinet Scheidemann discussed their proposals. Some of the bills were tabled in the National Assembly under this government, but only debated once it had resigned.

Social policy
A lack of fiscal resources combined with contradictory views in the cabinet also prevented new initiatives in social policy which was a contrast to the activist approach taken by the cabinet's predecessor, the socialist Council of the Peoples' Deputies. Laws prepared but not debated or passed by the cabinet included a codification of all labour laws and a first draft of the Betriebsrätegesetz (law on work councils). Short-term measures mostly fell into the purview of the Reichsministerium für die wirtschaftliche Demobilmachung and it was authorised to take most decisions by simple decree with no need for a cabinet decision. After its dissolution, these powers passed to the relevant ministries, in the case of social policy to the Reichsarbeitsministerium.

Foreign policy, armistice and Paris Peace Conference
Foreign policy in early 1919 was focussed on the armistice and the subsequent peace treaty. At the time, Germany had diplomatic relations with only a few neutral countries (e.g. Switzerland and the Netherlands), Austria and some countries in Eastern Europe. Relations with the latter were mainly influenced by the presence of German troops in the Baltic states, based on Art. XII of the Armistice (which required the German forces to remain in place as a bulwark against Soviet advances).

Armistice negotiations
Since November 1918, a permanent armistice commission (Waffenstillstandskommission), led by Erzberger, was at work negotiating with the Allies on interpretations of the agreed articles and on prolongations of the armistice (it was extended on 13 December 1918, 16 January 1919, and 16 February 1919).

On 16 February, the cabinet voted to reject the conditions for the third extension of the armistice as suggested by Brockdorff-Rantzau. It was deemed inacceptable that the Germans should be barred from resisting Polish military action in Posen and in other places, as long as the Allies refused to guarantee an end to hostilities on the part of the Poles. Whilst the Foreign Minister was willing to refrain from offensive military action, he thought formal acceptance of a line-of-control to be a degrading loss of sovereignty and the new policy of the Allies in regard to Poland to be in violation of Wilson's Fourteen Points. However, intervention by the leaders of the coalition parties caused a change of mind, and the cabinet decided to sign the third prolongation (this time indefinite). Brockdorff-Rantzau considered resigning. The cabinet decided to hand over a note of protest to the Allies, and the final version of the prolongation included some of the changes to the line-of-control requested by the German side.

Subsequently, the cabinet largely left it to Erzberger's commission to negotiate with the Allies over the situation in Posen. Similarly, the cabinet was not closely involved in the Brüsseler Lebensmittelabkommen of 14 March 1919 which secured much-needed Allied food shipments to Germany. By contrast, the cabinet dealt at length with the issue of whether to move the Polish Hallerarmee from France to Poland by sea via Danzig due to concerns that it might seize Western Prussia and thus cause the loss of a second province to Poland before the final peace treaty. In the end, the troops were transported across Germany by land (which still caused substantial resentment by Germans from Posen).

Paris conference and peace treaty

Yet the cabinet focused primarily on the peace treaty. Out of a total of 450 items in the official cabinet minutes, 170 dealt with this issue. Contrary to the way the armistice commission was handled—allowing it to become a sort of parallel government—the cabinet was to directly control the peace delegation. The delegation would possess authority to negotiate only within the confines of the fourteen points (as interpreted by the Germans). Anything that went beyond required the approval of the cabinet, especially the basic decision on acceptance or rejection of the treaty.

The cabinet thus held two basic premises: that there would be negotiations and that they would be based on Wilson's fourteen points. There is no evidence that alternative plans for the delegation were made for the case that these expectations would turn out to be wrong. The main reason for these expectations was bad information that fed wishful thinking. The German government was virtually in the dark about what had been decided by the negotiations between the Allies and their associated states in Paris. The cabinet's main sources of information were newspapers and reports by diplomatic staff from neutral countries, both relying heavily on rumours.

Preparations for peace negotiations had begun under Brockdorff-Rantzau's lead even before the cabinet was formed. By 27 January 1919, the Council of the People's Deputies had in hand an initial draft on the German position. It was altered multiple times before being finalised on 21 April 1919 as Richtlinien für die deutschen Friedensunterhändler. On 21/22 March 1919 the cabinet had debated the individual points at length and the meeting minutes show significant differences in position between various members of the cabinet.

Important organisational issues had also been settled before the cabinet took office. There would be a six-person delegation, supported by a substantial staff of commissioners from the ministries plus experts. In addition, an office of around 160 people was set up in Berlin, attached to the Foreign Office and led by Johann Heinrich von Bernstorff, working on questions of detail. It also served as nexus between delegation and cabinet.
 
The cabinet had difficulties agreeing on who was to fill these positions. The members of the delegation were changed several times and even the identity of its leader was not determined until the last moment (both Brockdorff-Rantzau and Landsberg were named in drafts). The composition of the delegation caused significant bad blood between Erzberger and Brockdorff-Rantzau.

On 18 April, French General Nudant handed over the invitation to Versailles to the German armistice commission. It was a shock to the cabinet, as the Germans were only to "receive" the draft of the treaty. The cabinet answered that it would send three civil servants, noting that their task would be simply to transmit the treaty to the government. In response, General Foch demanded that the Germans send delegates who were empowered to "negotiate the entirety of questions related to the peace". The cabinet now named the delegation that arrived in Versailles on 29 April: Brockdorff-Rantzau (chairman), Landsberg, Giesberts plus non-cabinet members Carl Melchior, a banker, president of the Prussian constituent assembly and mayor of Hanover, and Walther Schücking, an expert in international law.

Despite prior efforts to regulate the relationship between cabinet and delegation and the personal presence of several cabinet members in Paris, there was significant disunity between the two institutions. There were three main reasons for this: For one thing, the rules for the delegation had assumed that there would be face-to-face negotiations. Yet despite the fact that the Allied note from 20 April mentioned "negotiations", the representatives of the Entente now refused to meet the German delegates. For another, the fourteen points which were to delimit the delegation's authority were quite general in many respects, giving scope for delegation and cabinet to argue about jurisdiction. Finally, the personal differences between Erzberger and Brockdorff-Rantzau as well as the latter's hyper-sensitivity regarding encroachments on his authority played a role.

The delegation received the Allied conditions for peace on 7 May. Rather than waiting for a comprehensive German counterproposal, it started to send the Allies numerous notes on individual points, most of which were disavowed by the cabinet. Brockdorff-Rantzau complained about this interference by the cabinet, which caused the government to forbid the further use of these notes on 20 May. The delegation ignored this and after threats of resignation by several cabinet ministers, Scheidemann and some other members had to travel to Spa to meet with the delegation and settle the differences.
 
Issues that caused frictions between delegation and cabinet were the question of whether or not the reparation payments should be fixed in absolute terms as well as the question of German disarmament. The latter caused a serious confrontation with the military. The original idea had been to propose a land army of 300,000 men. This was later reduced to 200,000, then 100,000. Just as with the issue of reparations, the cabinet thought that by complaisance in this respect they could limit territorial losses to the Reich. However, the military, notably General Hans von Seeckt (commissioner of the Prussian Minister of War at the delegation) objected vehemently. The cabinet, especially Noske, stood their ground on this issue, though. Other controversies involved the question of responsibility for the war (Kriegsschuldfrage) and the possibility of bringing about an intervention by neutral countries in the case of unacceptable Allied demands (an idea of Erzberger's vigorously opposed by the Foreign Minister), which caused Reichskolonialminister Bell to travel to Versailles on 2 June, trying to mediate.
 
In the end, it turned out that all the arguments between cabinet and delegation had been pointless. On 16 June, the Allies presented the final version of their conditions for peace. In virtually no respect had the Allied demands been scaled back compared to the first draft of 7 May. The sole exception was the acceptance of a plebiscite in Oberschlesien (Upper Silesia). The negotiations in Versailles had been negotiations in name only.

Allied ultimatum and resignation of the cabinet

Initial position on the draft Treaty

In May, the cabinet decided to refrain from making an instant statement in reaction to the initial Allied draft of the Peace Treaty, hoping to achieve changes through negotiations. However, Scheidemann himself said that the Treaty was unerträglich (intolerable) and unerfüllbar (unfulfillable). On 12 May, he called it unannehmbar (unacceptable) in the National Assembly, to the acclaim of almost all the parties. In the cabinet, it was in particular the representatives of the DDP who threatened to resign unless the Treaty was rejected. Yet the cabinet decision specifically ruled out acceptance of the Treaty only "in its current form". On 3/4 June, the cabinet had a discussion about the possibility that the Allies would refuse to make any significant changes to the Treaty. Only Erzberger, David, Wissell and Noske clearly favoured signing in that case, all others were (to different degrees) opposed. Even at that stage, Wissell noted that the Cabinet Scheidemann would not be able to sign and that a replacement government would have to be established.

At least since late May, the cabinet had seriously discussed the ramifications of a German refusal to sign. In that case, the cabinet expected Allied troops to occupy Germany. Detailed contingency plans for such a scenario were not made, to avoid providing the USPD, which had argued for signing the Treaty, with political ammunition. Since the OHL planned to move all German troops to the east of the Elbe river should there be a resumption of hostilities, the cabinet was concerned about the actions of those States left unprotected by that strategy (Bavaria, Hesse, Baden and Württemberg). Leftist uprisings and/or a separate peace by these States were feared.

Reaction to the Allied ultimatum of 16 June
On 16 June, the Allies gave the German side five days to accept the treaty (later extended to seven days). The cabinet now faced a stark choice between acceptance, refusal and resignation. According to the Peace Delegation's assessment, the final Treaty was not in any meaningful way different from the version deemed "unacceptable" in May. Ultimately, however, the choice between acceptance and refusal rested with the majority parties and the National Assembly. Over the next several days, there seem to have been constant discussions between members of the cabinet, president Ebert, the Peace Delegation, and party representatives.

The chronological order is somewhat uncertain, but has been reconstructed as follows: On the morning of 18 June, the Peace Delegation returned to Weimar, Brockdorff-Rantzau reported to the cabinet and presented the common assessment of the delegation. After discussions in the parliamentary groups of the parties, the cabinet met again in the evening. There was no consensus on signing the Treaty. A vote showed that the cabinet was split (7 to 7 according to Erzberger's recollection; 8 for and 6 against signature, according to Landsberg). Since the cabinet was unable to reach a decision, the parties now had to decide.

An important influence was the possibility (or lack thereof) of resuming hostilities against the Allies with any hope of success. As early as 21 May, the OHL had surveyed the Generalkommandos (regional commands) on this question – with a clearly negative response. General Wilhelm Groener consequently argued in favour of signing the Treaty. He thus opposed the position of Prussian Kriegsminister Reinhardt as well as the majority of Reichswehr commanders who at a meeting on 19 June went so far as to openly threaten a revolt against the government should the Treaty be signed. Paul von Hindenburg, who was nominally in charge of the OHL, deferred to Groener on this issue. The position of the OHL provided significant if not decisive support for those favouring signature of the Treaty.

On 19 June, majorities of the parliamentary groups of SPD and Zentrum expressed support for signing, but the DDP was opposed. Later that day, the cabinet held a meeting with the Staatenausschuss, where a majority of the States supported acceptance of the Treaty. The crucial meeting of the cabinet took place that evening with the participation of party representatives. The DDP had prepared a mediation proposal to be handed to the Allies which included substantial changes to some of the Treaty's stipulations. If this was accepted by the Allies the DDP was willing to sign the Treaty. However, the cabinet was unable to reach a consensus on this issue. With no solution in sight, Scheidemann ended the meeting around midnight, went to see Reichspräsident Ebert and announced his resignation, along with Landsberg and Brockdorff-Rantzau.

The cabinet remained in office for another day and a half, since there were difficulties in forming a new government, willing to take responsibility for signing the Treaty. The DDP insisted on transmitting its proposal to the Allies, and it was almost sent, but was vetoed by the SPD in the last minute. Hermann Müller and Eduard David were both considered as new Reichsministerpräsident. Only on the morning of 21 June, when the DDP finally decided to stay out of the new government, Gustav Bauer was ready to lead a SPD and Zentrum cabinet that was willing to sign. The term of office of the Cabinet Scheidemann ended on 21 June at around 3 p.m. with the first cabinet meeting of the Bauer cabinet.

References

 Dederke, K., Reich und Republik – Deutschland 1917–1933 (German), Klett-Cotta, Stuttgart, 1996, .
 Das Kabinett Scheidemann – 13. Februar bis 20. Juni 1919, edited by Hagen Schulze, Boppard am Rhein (Haraldt Boldt Verlag), 1971 (= Akten der Reichskanzlei, 1) Online version (German)
 Schieck, H., Der Kampf um die deutsche Wirtschaftspolitik nach dem Novemberumsturz 1918 (German), Heidelberg, 1958.
 Schieck, H., Die Behandlung der Sozialisierungsfrage in den Monaten nach dem Staatsumsturz (German), in: Kolb, E. (ed.), Vom Kaiserreich zur Republik, Neue Wissenschaftliche Bibliothek 49, Köln, 1972, pp. 138–164.

Coalition governments of Germany
Historic German cabinets
German Revolution of 1918–1919
1919 establishments in Germany
1919 disestablishments in Germany
Cabinets established in 1919
Cabinets disestablished in 1919